Jim Gueno is a former linebacker in the National Football League.

Biography
Gueno was born James Andre Gueno on January 15, 1954 in Crowley, Louisiana.

Career
Gueno played football at the collegiate level for Tulane University.

Gueno was drafted by the Green Bay Packers in the ninth round of the 1976 NFL Draft and played with the team for five seasons. His main contributions were on the Packers' special teams, eventually earning the title of special teams captain.

See also
List of Green Bay Packers players

References

People from Crowley, Louisiana
Green Bay Packers players
American football linebackers
Tulane Green Wave football players
1954 births
Living people
Players of American football from Louisiana